Ukrainian Balsam is a Carpathian variety of a traditional, herbal, high-alcohol-content (35-45%) liqueur from Ukraine. It is aromatic and almost pitch black in color. It originally may have been used for medicinal purposes.

See also
 Balsam (drink)
 Riga Black Balsam
 Krasnaya Polyana Balsam 
 Bitters
 Digestif
 Flavored liquor

References

Bitters
Herbal liqueurs